Blauwgrond is a resort in Suriname, located in the Paramaribo District.  Its population at the 2012 census was 31,483. Blauwgrond started as a Javanese village to the north of Paramaribo. During the 1960s and 1970s, large scale building projects turned the village into a neighbourhood of Paramaribo, and is mainly known as the Javanese culinary centre with many warungs and restaurants. The resort was called Blauwgrond (English: Blue Ground), because the earth had a bluish colour.

Leonsberg is a former coffee plantation in the northern part of Blauwgrond. It was founded by A. Léon in 1819. At Leonsberg there is a ferry to Nieuw-Amsterdam.

References

Resorts of Suriname
Populated places in Paramaribo District